The 2021 Canadian Championship was the fourteenth edition of the Canadian Championship, contested from August 15 to November 21, 2021. The winners of the tournament, CF Montréal, were awarded the Voyageurs Cup and earned a berth in the 2022 CONCACAF Champions League.

Format
The competition follows a similar format to the originally proposed 2020 edition with four rounds and regional pairings in the first two rounds. For the first time in the Canadian Championship, each tie will be played as a single-leg fixture. CF Montréal, Forge FC, and Toronto FC enter the tournament in the quarter-finals due to their placements in the 2019 and 2020 editions of the competition. All other teams enter in the preliminary round of the tournament.

A.S. Blainville and Master's FA were originally supposed to participate in the 2020 edition of the competition, as they won the 2019 editions of the Première ligue de soccer du Québec and League1 Ontario, respectively. As the format of the 2020 edition was revised, their participation was postponed to the 2021 tournament.

Distribution

Qualified clubs

Note
 Statistics include previous incarnations of FC Edmonton, Montreal Impact, and Vancouver Whitecaps
 Appearances in the 2020 Canadian Championship are included for Toronto FC and Forge FC even though the championship was not played until following the start of the 2021 edition

Schedule

Bracket
The bracket was announced on July 19, 2021.

Preliminary round

Summary
The preliminary round matches were held between August 15 and 26, 2021.

|}

Matches

Quarter-finals

Summary

|}

Matches

Semi-finals

Summary

|}

Matches

Final

Match

Top goalscorers

Awards

 George Gross Memorial Trophy:  Sebastian Breza
 Best Young Canadian Player Award:  Jacob Shaffelburg

References

2021
2021 in Canadian soccer
2021 domestic association football cups
2021 North American domestic association football cups